Dylan John Llewellyn (born 10 September 1992) is an English actor, known for portraying Martin "Jono" Johnson in Hollyoaks, James Maguire in the Channel 4 sitcom Derry Girls, Jack in Big Boys and PC Kelby Hartford in Beyond Paradise.

Early life 
Llewellyn was born in Surrey, the youngest of three boys born to English parents. He attended More House School in Farnham, a specialist school for children with autism, developmental language disorder and dyslexia. Llewellyn attended RADA doing a foundation in Acting. Llewellyn has dyslexia, and found the support at a specialist school helpful.

Career

Acting 
Llewellyn appeared in the short film Travel Bag in 2009 and in 2010 he played Adam Wilcock in an episode of the television series The Bill. In 2011, Llewellyn began playing Martin "Jono" Johnson in the soap opera Hollyoaks and in the spin-off Hollyoaks Later. He made his last appearance in Hollyoaks on 16 November 2012 after his character was killed off. Since leaving Hollyoaks, Llewellyn has made appearances in Holby City (2013) and in the films Frequencies (2013) and Down Dog (2014). Llewellyn was struggling with acting jobs and was close to giving up acting whilst working part-time in a deli. This is when he got the call that he was cast on Derry Girls. 

From 2018 to 2022, Llewelyn played the role of James Maguire in the Channel 4 sitcom Derry Girls. In 2020, Llewellyn played Stewart Irmsby in an episode of series 9 of Call the Midwife. Since 2022 Llewellyn has played main character Jack in the Channel 4 series Big Boys. Jack is a quiet teen who is coming to terms with both the death of his father and his own sexuality. The role is a fictionalised version of creator Jack Rooke.

Other television 
On 6 July 2018, Llewellyn appeared on an episode of the game show The Crystal Maze alongside his Derry Girls co-stars. On 1 January 2019, Llewellyn made a guest appearance on The Inbetweeners: Fwends Reunited. In March 2019, he made guest appearances on The One Show and Lorraine. On 31 December 2019, Llewellyn appeared on an episode of Celebrity Mastermind. On 1 January 2020, Llewellyn appeared on a Derry Girls edition of The Great British Bake Off. On 26 June 2020, Llewellyn performed a sketch with his Derry Girls co-stars alongside Saoirse Ronan for the RTÉ fundraising special RTÉ Does Comic Relief. All proceeds from the night went towards those affected by the COVID-19 pandemic. Since February of 2023, he has starred as PC Kelby Hartford on “Beyond Paradise”, a spin-off of the still running hit show “Death In Paradise”. The new show focuses on DI Humphrey Goodman returning home to England and starting his job as DI in a small village in Devon. PC Hartford is his supporting constable.

Filmography

Film

Television

Theatre

References

External links 
 

21st-century English male actors
English male film actors
English male television actors
Living people
Male actors from Surrey
1992 births
Actors with dyslexia